Bordeaux is an unincorporated community in Platte County, Wyoming, United States.

Notable person
John C. Hunton - Confederate veteran, pioneer and rancher.

Notes

Unincorporated communities in Platte County, Wyoming
Unincorporated communities in Wyoming